Adolfo Ovaller may refer:

 Adolfo Ovalle (footballer, born 1970)
 Adolfo Ovalle (footballer, born 1997)